Lara Lewington (born 10 May 1979) in Chichester, West Sussex is a British television presenter, journalist and former weather presenter. She co-presents the BBC's technology programme Click.

Early life
Lewington attended Surbiton High School, an independent school in Surbiton, Greater London. She studied at St Mary's University, Twickenham. She reports working as a runner on the game show It's a Knockout while at the university.

Career
Lewington joined Five in January 2003, as their weather presenter. She spent six years at the channel, also becoming the showbiz correspondent for Five News, before a stint as showbiz correspondent on Sky News.

She contributed to various shows including The Weakest Link News and Weather special, ITV1's Celebrities Exposed and E!'s 101 Greatest programmes. She has also appeared weekly on ITV's The Impressionable Jon Culshaw, was a panellist on ITV's Win, Lose or Draw, and has appeared on BBC Two's Newsnight, Channel 4's RI:SE, Big Brother's Big Mouth, ITV's Britain's Best Dish, the BBC's Let's Dance For Sports Relief and appeared as one of the four representatives of Five TV on the BBC One Sport Relief Superstars special.

Lewington joined BBC's Click in 2011 as a reporter and later became a presenter in 2018. She co-presents the show with Spencer Kelly and appears on other radio and television shows talking about technology. She has also been the technology columnist for Woman magazine.

Other appearances
Lewington can be seen presenting the weather on a background monitor in the Daily Planet newsroom in the 2006 film Superman Returns. She appeared in British comedy feature film Shouting Men (2010) and BBC2's Happiness.

Personal life
Lewington married financial journalist and broadcaster Martin Lewis in 2009. They have one daughter born in 2012.

References

External links
 

1979 births
Living people
Alumni of St Mary's University, Twickenham
Place of birth missing (living people)
Weather presenters
British television presenters